Gaziantep Polis Gücü SK is a Turkish multi-sport club based in Gaziantep. It is sponsored by the Gaziantep Police Directoriate. The club consists of four branches, namely football, handball, field hockey and shooting sport. Since 2013, the club's chairman is Mehmet Kaplan.

Gaziantep Polis Gücü SK was established in the main aim to promote good relations between the society and the law enforcement as well as to offer to the street children and also to the children in the rural area under risk a social investment for the future and keep them away from crime and bad habits. As of May 2012, the club had around 300 sportspeople. The club has also summer camp courses on sport branches such as field hockey, football, karate, taekwondo and judo for around 250 children from low-income families.

The club's football side plays in the amateur league while the hockey team is successful in the Turkish Field and Indoor Hockey Super Leagues. The hockey team achieved a third place in 2008 at the Eurohockey Men’s Club Champions Challenge IV. In May 2013, the hockey team won the 2013 Eurohockey Men’s Club Champions Challenge III in Slovakia and was promoted to one higher division for the next year's competition. 34 players of the hockey team, which has ten Turkish champion titles sofar, were admitted to the Turkey national teams. Two of the shooting sport squad are Turkish champions in air pistol event, and three sportsmen compete in the national team.

References